The New Noah is a book written by British naturalist and writer Gerald Durrell.  It was first published by Collins in 1955.

The book is an account for older children of his various expeditions to collect animals for zoos, to some extent an anthology of the best bits from various previous accounts.

References

External links
The New Noah by Gerald Durrell at shoarns.com

Gerald Durrell
1955 non-fiction books
William Collins, Sons books
Zoology books